Microdrillia is a genus of very small sea snails, marine gastropod mollusks in the family Borsoniidae.

Description
The species in this genus are characterized by a well-developed, multispiral, closely coiled protoconch. One to three of its basal whorls are costulate. The body whorl is wholly devoid of costae but spirally carinate. The retral sinus is relatively large, circularly rounded and close to the suture. The aperture is oblique. The columella is callous, with or without plications. The siphonal canal is short or subobsolete.

The following species of this genus are also found as fossils in the age range of 48.6 Ma to 0.781 Ma: Microdrillia comatotropis, Microdrillia cossmanni, Microdrillia crispata, Microdrillia harrisi, Microdrillia ouchitae, Microdrillia propetrina, Microdrillia tersa, Microdrillia trina

Distribution
This marine genus occurs in the Gulf of Oman, off South Africa and off Australia (New South Wales, Queensland).

Species
 † Microdrillia aturensis Lozouet, 2017 
 Microdrillia circumvertens (Melvill & Standen, 1901)
 Microdrillia commentica (Hedley, 1915)
 Microdrillia dinos Kilburn, 1986
 Microdrillia fastosa (Hedley, 1907)
 † Microdrillia meyeri (Cossmann, 1889) 
 Microdrillia niponica (E. A. Smith, 1879)
 Microdrillia optima (Thiele, 1925)
  † Microdrillia pakaurangia Powell, 1942
 Microdrillia patricia (Melvill, 1904)
 Microdrillia pertinax (Hedley, 1922)
 Microdrillia rhomboidales Stahlschmidt, Poppe & Tagaro, 2018
 Microdrillia sagamiensis Kuroda & Oyama, 1971
 Microdrillia sansibarica (Thiele, 1925)
 † Microdrillia serratula (Bellardi, 1877) 
 Microdrillia stephensensis Laseron, 1954
 † Microdrillia teretiaeformis A.W. Janssen, 1972 
 Microdrillia trina Mansfield, 1925
 Microdrillia triporcata (E. A. Smith, 1879)

 Species brought into synonymy
 Microdrillia crispata (Cristofori & Jan, 1832): synonym of Drilliola crispata (De Cristofori & Jan, 1832)
 Microdrillia difficilis (E. A. Smith, 1879): synonym of Drilliola difficilis (E. A. Smith, 1879)
 Microdrillia loprestiana (Calcara, 1841): synonym of Drilliola loprestiana (Calcara, 1841)
 Microdrillia pruina (Watson, 1881): synonym of Retidrillia pruina (Watson, 1881)
 Microdrillia zeuxippe (Dall, 1919): synonym of Drilliola zeuxippe (Dall, 1919)

References

 Thiele J. (1925). Gastropoden der Deutschen Tiefsee-Expedition. II Teil. Wissenschaftliche Ergebnisse der Deutschen Tiefsee-Expedition auf dem Dampfer "Valdivia" 1898-1899. 17(2): 35-382, pls 13-46 
 Kilburn R.N. (1986). Turridae (Mollusca: Gastropoda) of southern Africa and Mozambique. Part 3. Subfamily Borsoniinae. Annals of the Natal Museum. 27: 633-720.

External links
 Casey T.L. (1903). Notes in the Conrad collection of Vicksburg fossils, with descriptions of new species. Proceedings of the Academy of Natural Sciences, Philadelphia 55: 261-283
  Bouchet P., Kantor Yu.I., Sysoev A. & Puillandre N. (2011) A new operational classification of the Conoidea. Journal of Molluscan Studies 77: 273-308
 
 De Jong K.M. & Coomans H.E. (1988) Marine gastropods from Curaçao, Aruba and Bonaire. Leiden: E.J. Brill. 261 pp.